Zborov nad Bystricou is a village and municipality in Čadca District in the Žilina Region of northern Slovakia.

History 

In historical records the village was first mentioned in 1662.
Before 1918 the official name was Felsozboró, or only Zboró.  The total population in 1910 was 1,607 which included mostly Roman Catholic Slovaks.  The region was devastated by the attacks of Tartars in the 13th century and the first settlers came here after 1400AD (Stara Bystrica).  Zborov nad Bystricou were founded by the Valach colonists in the 15th century.

Geography 

The municipality lies at an altitude of 420 metres and covers an area of 18.709 km². It has a population of about 2290 people.

External links 
 https://web.archive.org/web/20071116010355/http://www.statistics.sk/mosmis/eng/run.html
 Village website (in Slovak)

References 

Villages and municipalities in Čadca District